Sund is a small village in the Faroe Islands, located north of Tórshavn.

In 2020, it had a population of only 1 person.

See also
 List of towns in the Faroe Islands

References

External links

Populated places in the Faroe Islands
Populated coastal places in the Faroe Islands
Streymoy